IF Vesta is a sports club in Uppsala, Sweden, established on 8 June 1911. The club runs bandy and soccer, earlier even ice hockey and floorball.

History
In the first year of bandy league system in Sweden, 1930–31, Vesta entered in Division 1 Norra together with
AIK, Hammarby IF, IFK Rättvik, IK Sirius, Skutskärs IF, SK Tirfing, and Västerås SK and finished 7th.

The men's bandy team played eleven seasons in the Swedish top division.

References

External links
Bandy 
Soccer 

IF Vesta
Bandy clubs in Sweden
Defunct ice hockey teams in Sweden
Football clubs in Uppsala County
IF Vesta
Association football clubs established in 1911
Bandy clubs established in 1911
Swedish floorball teams